This is a list of schools in Barrow-in-Furness, Cumbria, England.

There are 26 schools in Barrow educating at a primary level (including infant and junior schools), three secondary schools and two colleges of further education. Chetwynde School, formerly a private school educates at all three levels. Although all educational institutes in the town are now state-funded, a number have varying degrees of governance. Furness Academy and Walney School are academies, while schools in the list below marked 'VA' or 'VC' are voluntary aided or controlled (primarily by faith groups).

State-funded schools

Primary schools
 Barrow Island Community Primary School
 Brisbane Park Infant School
 Cambridge Primary School
 Chetwynde School
 Dane Ghyll Community Primary School 
 Greengate Infant & Nursery School
 Greengate Junior School
 Hindpool Nursery School
 Holy Family Catholic Primary School (VA)
 Newbarns Primary School
 Newton Primary School 
 North Walney Primary School
 Ormsgill Primary School
 Ramsden Infant School 
 Roose School
 Sacred Heart Catholic Primary School (VA)
 South Walney Infant and Nursery School
 South Walney Junior School
 St Columba's Catholic Primary School (VA)
 St George's CofE School (VC)
 St James' CofE Junior School (VA)
 St Paul's CofE Junior School (VA)
 St Pius X Catholic Primary School (VA)
 Vickerstown School 
 Victoria Infant and Nursery School
 Victoria Junior School
 Yarlside Primary School

Secondary schools
 Chetwynde School
 Furness Academy
 St Bernard's Catholic High School
 Walney School

Special schools
 George Hastwell School
 Newbridge House PRU

Further education
 Barrow Sixth Form College
 Chetwynde School
 Furness College

Former schools
 Alfred Barrow School
 Barrow Boys Grammar School
 Barrow Girls Grammar School
 Barrow Higher Grade School
 John Whinnerah Institute
 Barrow Technical School
 Parkview Community College of Technology
 Risedale School
 Thorncliffe School

See also
 List of schools in Cumbria

References
 Cumbria County Council School Search

List